Epithelial membrane protein 2 is a protein that in humans is encoded by the EMP2 gene.

Clinical significance
Mutations in EMP2 cause Childhood-Onset Nephrotic Syndrome.

References

Further reading